Třemešné is a municipality and village in Tachov District in the Plzeň Region of the Czech Republic. It has about 400 inhabitants.

Administrative parts
Villages of Bezděkov, Dubec, Nová Ves and Pavlíkov are administrative parts of Třemešné.

History
The first written mention of Třemešné is from 1436.

References

Villages in Tachov District